An ectoparasiticide is an antiparasitic drug used in the treatment of ectoparasitic infestations. These drugs are used to kill the parasites that live on the body surface. Permethrin, sulfur, lindane, dicophane, benzyl benzoate, ivermectin and crotamiton are well known ectoparasiticides.

Permethrin

Broad-spectrum and potent pyrethroid insecticide  and is most convenient for both scabies and lice. First choice drug. 100% cure rate. Causes neurological paralysis in insects probably by delaying depolarisation.

Crotamiton

Second choice drug. Effective scabicide, pediculocide and antipruritic. Cure rate 60-88%.

Benzyl benzoate

2nd line drug for scabies and is seldom used for pediculosis. Cure rate 76-100%

Lindane

Effective in treating head lice (67-92%cure) and scabies (84-92% cure) with a single treatment. Penetrates through chitinous covers and affecting the nervous system.

Sulfur

Oldest scabicide and weak pediculocide, antiseptic, fungicide and keratolytic. Applied to skin, it is slowly reduced to H2S and oxidized to SO2 and pentathionic acid, which dissolve the cuticle of itch mites and kill it.

Ivermectin

Antihelminthic drug found highly effective in scabies and pediculosis. It is the only orally administered drug used for ectoparasitosis. Acts through a glutamate-gated Cl− ion channel found only in invertebrates.

Dicophan

Insecticide for mosquito, flies and other pests. Penetrates through the exoskeleton and acts as a neurotoxin.

References

Antiparasitic agents